The 2015 West Berkshire Council election took place on 7 May 2015 to elect members of West Berkshire Council in England. This was on the same day as other local elections.  The whole council was up for election and the Conservative Party retained overall control of the council.

Background
At the last election in 2011, the Conservatives won a majority of seats, with 39 councillors, compared to 13 for the Liberal Democrats. No other parties had representation on the council. Two by-elections were held between the 2011 and 2015 elections, both being retained by the Conservatives.

Results

References

2015 English local elections
May 2015 events in the United Kingdom
2015
2010s in Berkshire